Maquillaje (Spanish for "make-up") may refer to:

 Maquillaje, a 2001 album by Zurdok
 "Maquillaje", a 1986 song by Mecano from their debut self-titled album